Luetkenotyphlus brasiliensis, the São Paulo caecilian, is a species of caecilian in the family Siphonopidae. It is found in Misiones Province in northern Argentina and northwards to São Paulo state in Brazil; it likely occurs in adjacent Paraguay.

Luetkenotyphlus brasiliensis is a poorly known species. It probably inhabits forest, but it has also been found in urban gardens. This suggests that it is somewhat adaptable species.

References

Siphonopidae
Amphibians of Argentina
Amphibians of Brazil
Amphibians described in 1851
Taxonomy articles created by Polbot